The Caribbean island nation of Aruba competed at the 2012 Summer Olympics in London, United Kingdom from 27 July – 12 August 2012. This was the nation's seventh Olympiad as an independent nation.

Four Aruban athletes were selected to the team, competing at their first Games, only in judo, swimming, and weightlifting; all of them participated under Universality places and tripartite invitation, without having qualified. Aruba, however, has never won an Olympic medal.

Judo

Aruba has had 1 judoka invited.

Swimming

Men

Women

Weightlifting

Men

References

Nations at the 2012 Summer Olympics
2012
2012 in Aruba